The 23rd European Film Awards were presented on 4 December, 2010, in Tallinn, Estonia.

Winners and nominees
The nominations for the 23rd European Film Awards were announced on 6 November at the Seville European Film Festival.

Best Film

Best Director
 Roman Polanski – The Ghost Writer 
 Olivier Assayas – Carlos
 Semih Kaplanoğlu – Honey (Bal)
 Samuel Maoz – Lebanon
 Paolo Virzì – The First Beautiful Thing (La prima cosa bella)

Best Actress
 Sylvie Testud – Lourdes 
 Zrinka Cvitešić – On the Path (Na putu)
 Sibel Kekilli – When We Leave (Die Fremde)
 Lesley Manville – Another Year
 Lotte Verbeek – Nothing Personal

Best Actor
 Ewan McGregor – The Ghost Writer 
 Jakob Cedergren – Submarino
 Elio Germano – Our Life (La nostra vita)
George Piştereanu – If I Want to Whistle, I Whistle (Eu când vreau să fluier, fluier)
 Luis Tosar – Cell 211 (Celda 211)

Best Animated Feature Film
 The Illusionist – Sylvain Chomet • United Kingdom/France 
Planet 51 –  • Spain/United Kingdom
Sammy's Adventures: The Secret Passage – Ben Stassen • Belgium

Best Screenwriter
 Robert Harris and Roman Polanski – The Ghost Writer 
Jorge Guerricaechevarría and Daniel Monzón – Cell 211 (Celda 211)
 Samuel Maoz – Lebanon
 Radu Mihaileanu – The Concert (Le concert)

Best Cinematographer
 Giora Bejach – Lebanon 
Caroline Champetier – Of Gods and Men (Des hommes et des dieux)
Pavel Kostomarov – How I Ended This Summer (Как я провел этим летом)
Barış Özbiçer – Honey (Bal)

Best Editor
 Luc Barnier and Marion Monnier – Carlos 
Arik Lahav-Leibovich – Lebanon
 Hervé de Luze – The Ghost Writer

Best Production Designer
 Albrecht Konrad – The Ghost Writer 
Paola Bizzarri and Luis Ramirez – I, Don Giovanni (Io, Don Giovanni)
Markku Pätilä and Jaagup Roomet – The Temptation of St. Tony (Püha Tõnu kiusamine)

Best Composer
 Alexandre Desplat – The Ghost Writer 
Ales Brezina – Kawasaki's Rose (Kawasakiho růže)
Pasquale Catalano – Loose Cannons (Mine vaganti)
 Gary Yershon – Another Year

Best Documentary
'Nostalgia for the Light (Nostalgia de la luz) – Patricio Guzmán • France/Germany/Chile Armadillo – Janus Metz • Denmark/Sweden
Steam of Life (Miesten vuoro) – Joonas Berghäll and Mika Hotakainen • Finland/Sweden

Best Short Film Hanoi - Warsaw (Hanoi - Warszawa) – Katarzyna Klimkiewicz • Poland Amor – Thomas Wangsmo • Norway
Lights (Ampelmann) – Giulio Ricciarelli • Germany
Joseph’s Snails (Les escargots de Joseph) – Sophie Roze • France
Stay, Away (Blijf bij me, weg) – Paloma Aguilera Valdebenito • Netherlands
Out of Love (Ønskebørn) – Birgitte Stærmose • Denmark
Venus VS Me – Nathalie Teirlinck • Belgium
The Little Snow Animal (Lumikko) – Miia Tervo • Finland
Tussilago – Jonas Odell • Sweden
Maria's Way – Anne Milne • United Kingdom/Spain
Talleres Clandestinos – Catalina Molina • Austria/Argentina
Rendezvous in Stella-Plage (Rendez-vous à Stella-Plage) – Shalimar Preuss • France
Diarchy (Diarchia) – Ferdinando Cito Filomarino • Italy/France
The External World – David O'Reilly • Germany
Here I Am (Itt vagyok) – Bálint Szimler • Hungary

People's Choice Award for Best European Film Mr. Nobody ' The Girl Who Played with Fire (Flickan som lekte med elden)
 Soul Kitchen Baarìa Loose Cannons (Mine vaganti)
 An Education Agora The Ghost Writer Kick-Ass Little Nicholas (Le Petit Nicolas'')

References

2010 film awards
European Film Awards ceremonies
Culture in Tallinn
2010 in Estonia
2010 in Europe